Odontochilus is a small genus from the orchid family (Orchidaceae). These terrestrial, mycoparasitic orchids occur from China, Japan, the Himalayas, Southeast Asia, New Guinea and Melanesia. The genus is related to Gonatostylis, endemic to New Caledonia.

Species 
Species accepted as of June 2014:

 Odontochilus acalcaratus (Aver.) Ormerod (2002). - southern Vietnam
 Odontochilus asraoa (J.Joseph & Abbar.) Ormerod (2005) - India, Nepal, Bhutan
 Odontochilus brevistylus Hook.f., (1890) - Tibet, Yunnan, Peninsular Malaysia, Thailand, Vietnam
 Odontochilus clarkei Hook.f. (1890) - India, Bhutan, Assam, Tibet, Myanmar
 Odontochilus crispus (Lindl.) Hook.f. (1890) - India, Bhutan, Assam, Tibet, Myanmar, Yunnan
 Odontochilus degeneri L.O.Williams (1942) - Fiji
 Odontochilus duplex (Holttum) Ormerod (2005) - Thailand, Malaysia
 Odontochilus elwesii C.B.Clarke ex Hook.f. (1890) - India, Bhutan, Assam, Tibet, Myanmar, Taiwan, Guangxi, Guizhou, Sichuan
 Odontochilus grandiflorus (Lindl.) Hook.f. (1890) - Bhutan, Assam
 Odontochilus guangdongensis S.C.Chen, S.W.Gale & P.J.Cribb (2009) - Guangdong, Hunan
 Odontochilus hasseltii (Blume) J.J.Wood (2011) - Borneo, Java, Sumatra
 Odontochilus hydrocephalus (J.J.Sm.) J.J.Wood (2011)- Borneo
 Odontochilus inabae (Hayata) Hayata ex T.P.Lin - Japan, Yakushima, Ryukyu Islands, Taiwan, Vietnam
 Odontochilus lanceolatus (Lindl.) Blume (1859) - India, Bhutan, Assam, Tibet, Myanmar, Sikkim, Nepal, Thailand, Vietnam, Guangdong, Guangxi, Taiwan, Yunnan 
 Odontochilus longiflorus (Rchb.f.) Benth. & Hook.f. ex B.D.Jacks. (1894) - New Guinea, Solomons, Fiji, Samoa, Vanuatu	
 Odontochilus macranthus Hook.f. (1890) - Peninsular Malaysia, Thailand
 Odontochilus nanlingensis (L.P.Siu & K.Y.Lang) Ormerod (2003) - Guangdong, Taiwan
 Odontochilus poilanei (Gagnep.) Ormerod (2002) - Japan, Myanmar, Thailand, Vietnam, Tibet, Yunnan
 Odontochilus reniformis (Hook.f.) Ormerod (1998) - Perak
 Odontochilus saprophyticus (Aver.) Ormerod (2003) - Hainan, Vietnam
 Odontochilus serriformis (J.J.Sm.) J.J.Wood (2011) - Sabah
 Odontochilus tashiroi (Maxim.) Makino (1900) - Ryukyu Islands
 Odontochilus tetrapterus (Hook.f.) Av.Bhattacharjee & H.J.Chowdhery (2011) - Manipur
 Odontochilus tortus King & Pantl. (1896) - Guangxi, Hainan, Tibet, Yunnan, Assam, Sikkim, Bhutan, Myanmar, Thailand, Vietnam
 Odontochilus umbrosus (Aver.) Ormerod (2002) - Vietnam
 Odontochilus uniflorus (Blume) H.A.Pedersen & Ormerod (2009) - Peninsular Malaysia, Thailand

References

External links 

Goodyerinae
Cranichideae genera
Orchids of Asia